Belma Sabotic (born 27 January 2004) is a Luxembourger footballer who plays as a forward for Dames Ligue 1 club Fola Esch and the Luxembourg women's national team.

International career
Sabotic made her senior debut for Luxembourg on 12 June 2021 during a 0–1 friendly loss against Belgium.

References

2004 births
Living people
Women's association football forwards
Luxembourgian women's footballers
Luxembourg women's international footballers